Ernest Maltravers may refer to:
 Ernest Maltravers (novel), an 1837 novel by Edward Bulwer-Lytton
 Ernest Maltravers (play), an 1838 American stage adaptation by Louisa Medina
 Ernest Maltravers (1914 film), an American film adaptation
 Ernest Maltravers (1920 film), A British film adaptation directed by Jack Denton